Khlong Thanon is a khwaeng (subdistrict) of Sai Mai District, in Bangkok, Thailand. In 2020, it had a total population of 85,149 people.

References

Subdistricts of Bangkok
Sai Mai district